The Night of Decision is a 1938 German drama film directed by Nunzio Malasomma and starring Pola Negri, Hans Zesch-Ballot and Sabine Peters. The film was Negri's final production in Nazi Germany, made at the time of the Munich Crisis. It was an independent film.

The film's sets were designed by the art director Robert A. Dietrich and Artur Günther.

Cast

References

Bibliography

External links 
 

1938 films
1938 drama films
German drama films
Films of Nazi Germany
1930s German-language films
Films directed by Nunzio Malasomma
German black-and-white films
1930s German films